{{Automatic taxobox
| fossil_range = 
| image = Purgatorius PNAS.jpg
| image_caption = Life restoration of Purgatorius
| taxon = Purgatoriidae
| authority = 
| subdivision = 
Purgatorius
Ursolestes
}}

Purgatoriidae is a basal plesiadapiform family that includes, Purgatorius and Ursolestes''. Purgatoriids are thought to represent the earliest members of the Plesiadapiformes and to be their ancestors – as well as primates.

References 

Paleocene mammals
Purgatoriidae
Prehistoric mammal families